The 2013 FIG Artistic Gymnastics World Cup series consists of 10 events in total.

Formats

World Cups

World Challenge Cups

Medal winners

Individual all-around

Men

Women

Men's Apparatus

Floor

Pommel horse

Rings

Vault

Parallel bars

Horizontal bar

Women's Apparatus

Vault

Uneven Bars

Balance Beam

Floor Exercise

See also
 2013 FIG Rhythmic Gymnastics World Cup series

References

2013
Artistic Gymnastics World Cup